The Guadarrama Pass, also known as Alto del León, is a mountain pass in Spain. It is located in the Sierra de Guadarrama, part of the Sistema Central system of ranges. 
Historically it has been an important communication line between Madrid and the North of Spain.

Geography

The Guadarrama Pass is an important communication line between Segovia Province and the Madrid area through the N-VI highway between Madrid and Corunna.

History
There are remains of Spanish Civil War bunkers and trenches in the area of the pass. The rebel faction took the northern side of the range after the Battle of Guadarrama and the Second Division of the Spanish Republican Army operated in the area between December 1936 and March 1939.

See also
Central System

References

External links

Mountain passes of the Sistema Central
Sierra de Guadarrama
Mountain passes of Spain